The Grace Lee Project is a 2005 American documentary film directed and co-written by Grace Lee.  It is about Lee's attempt to define a common set of stereotypes associated with the name that she shares with the film's subjects.

Synopsis 
Growing up in Columbia, Missouri, director Grace Lee felt that she had a unique name and identity, as there were not many other Asians in her community.  When she moved to New York City and Los Angeles, she found her name shared by many other people.  Dissatisfied with the "nice" personality commonly ascribed to the Asian-American women with this name, she sets out to find people who break the mold, including Grace Lee Boggs, a Chinese-American philosopher and activist.

Production 
Lee traveled throughout the United States to meet other people with her name.  Although she heard from non-Asians, she chose to focus solely on people of Asian descent.  Funding was made possible through public television.

Release 
The Grace Lee Project opened in New York on December 14, 2005.

Reception 
   

Dennis Harvey of Variety wrote that the film's "trivial-sounding hook manages to float a funny but complex meditation on identity, ethnicity and cultural expectations". John Anderson of the Los Angeles Times called it "a journey of realization for anyone who's ever felt lost in the crowd." Stephen Holden of The New York Times described it as a witty autobiography that is "really about cultural assimilation and a stereotype of virtue and subservience that has deep roots on both sides of the Pacific." Noel Murray of The A.V. Club wrote of Lee that "her technique is pretty much everything that's wrong with documentary filmmaking today."

References

External links 
 
 
 

2005 films
2005 documentary films
Films about Korean Americans
American documentary films
Autobiographical documentary films
Films directed by Grace Lee
Documentary films about Asian Americans
Documentary films about women
2000s English-language films
2000s American films